Filyovsky Park may refer to:
Filyovsky park District, a district in Western Administrative Okrug of Moscow, Russia
Filyovsky Park (Moscow Metro), a station of the Moscow Metro, Moscow, Russia